During the 2008–09 football season Portsmouth played their sixth consecutive season in the highest tier of English football, the Premier League. Thanks to the exploits of the previous season, Portsmouth achieved European football for the first time in their footballing history, thanks to an FA Cup win over Cardiff City; they competed in the UEFA Cup. They also participated in the Charity Shield, against Manchester United on 10 August 2008, at Wembley Stadium, eventually losing on penalties. This was the first time since 1996 that a team outside of the "Big Four" had competed in the competition.

Transfer summary

In

Out

Statistics

Appearances

Goalkeepers

Defenders

Midfielders

Forwards

Others
Includes players who have yet to feature prominently and former players.

Competitions

Community Shield

Portsmouth lost the 2008 FA Community Shield 3–1 on penalties against 2007–08 Premier League winners Manchester United after the match finished 0–0 after 90 minutes on 10 August. It was Pompey's second game against United in the space of two weeks.

Premier League

Matches

Final league table

Results summary

UEFA Cup

Group stage

Matches

Top scorers
  Jermain Defoe 7
  Niko Kranjčar 3
  Glen Johnson 3
  David Nugent 3

References

External links
2008–09 Portsmouth F.C. season at ESPN

2008-09
2008–09 Premier League by team